List of California ballot propositions: 2000–2009

Elections

March 7, 2000

1A – Passed – Gambling on Tribal Lands. Legislative Constitutional Amendment.
12 – Passed – Safe Neighborhood Parks, Clean Water, Clean Air, and Coastal Protection Bond Act of 2000.
13 – Passed – Safe Drinking Water, Clean Water, Watershed Protection, and Flood Protection Bond Act.
14 – Passed – California Reading and Literacy Improvement and Public Library Construction and Renovation Bond Act of 2000
15 – Failed – The Hertzberg-Polanco Crime Laboratories Construction Bond Act of 1999.
16 – Passed – Veterans Homes Bond Act of 2000.
17 – Passed – Lotteries. Charitable Raffles. Legislative Constitutional Amendment.
18 – Passed – Murder: Special Circumstances. Legislative Initiative Amendment.
19 – Passed – Murder. BART and CSU Peace Officers. Legislative Initiative Amendment.
20 – Passed – California State Lottery. Allocation for Instructional Materials. Legislative Initiative Amendment.
21 – Passed – Juvenile Crime. Initiative Statute.
22 – Passed – Limit on Marriages. Initiative Statute.
23 – Failed – 'None of the Above' Ballot Option. Initiative Statute.
24 – Removed from ballot by order of the California Supreme Court. Proposed proposition concerned legislative pay and travel expenses, as well as a financial penalty to be assessed if lawmakers did not pass the annual budget in a timely manner. Deemed to violate the single subject clause of the California Constitution 
25 – Failed – Election Campaigns. Contributions and Spending Limits. Public Financing. Disclosures. Initiative Statute.
26 – Failed – School Facilities. Local Majority Vote. Bonds, Taxes. Initiative Constitutional Amendment and Statute.
27 – Failed – Elections. Term Limit Declarations for Congressional Candidates. Initiative Statute.
28 – Failed – Repeal of Proposition 10 Tobacco Surtax. Initiative Statute.
29 – Passed – 1998 Indian Gaming Compacts. Referendum Statute.
30 – Failed – Insurance Claims Practices. Civil Remedies. Referendum.
31 – Failed – Insurance Claims Practices. Civil Remedy Amendments. Referendum.

November 7, 2000

32 – Passed – Veterans' Bond Act of 2000. A.B. 2305.
33 – Failed – Legislature. Participation in Public Employees' Retirement System. A.C.A. 12.
34 – Passed – Campaign Contributions and Spending. Limits. Disclosure. S.B. 1223.
35 – Passed – Public Works Projects. Use of Private Contractors for Engineering and Architectural Services. Initiative.
36 – Passed – Drugs. Probation and Treatment Program. Initiative.
37 – Failed – Fees. Vote Requirements. Taxes. Initiative.
38 – Failed – School Vouchers. State-Funded Private and Religious Education. Public Schoolfunding. Initiative.
39 – Passed – School Facilities. 55% Local Vote. Bonds, Taxes. Accountability Requirements. Initiative.

March 5, 2002
40 – Passed – The California Clean Water, Clean Air, Safe Neighborhood Parks, and Coastal Protection Act of 2002. AB 1602.
41 – Passed – Voting Modernization Bond Act of 2002. (Shelley-Hertzberg Act). AB 56.
42 – Passed – Transportation Congestion Improvement Act. Allocation of Existing Motor Vehicle Fuel Sales and Use Tax Revenues for Transportation Purposes Only. Legislative Constitutional Amendment. ACA 4.
43 – Passed – Right to Have Vote Counted. ACA 9.
44 – Failed – Chiropractors. Unprofessional Conduct. SB 1988.
45 – Failed – Legislative Term Limits. Local Voter Petitions. Initiative.

November 5, 2002
46 – Passed – Housing and Emergency Shelter Trust Fund Act of 2002. S.B. 1227.
47 – Passed – Kindergarten-University Public Education Facilities Bond Act of 2002. A.B. 47.
48 – Passed – Court Consolidation. A.C.A. 15.
49 – Passed – Before and After School Programs. State Grants. Initiative.
50 – Passed – Water Quality, Supply and Safe Drinking Water Projects. Coastal Wetlands Purchase and Protection. Bonds. Initiative.
51 – Failed – Transportation. Distribution of Existing Motor Vehicle Sales and Use Tax. Initiative.
52 – Failed – Election Day Voter Registration. Voter Fraud Penalties. Initiative.

October 7, 2003
53 – Failed – Funds Dedicated for State and Local Infrastructure. Legislative Constitutional Amendment. A.C.A. 11.
54 – Failed – Classification by Race, Ethnicity, Color, or National Origin. Initiative Constitutional Amendment.

March 2, 2004
55 – Passed – Kindergarten-University Public Education Facilities Bond Act of 2004.
56 – Failed – State Budget, Related Taxes, and Reserve. Voting Requirements. Penalties. Initiative Constitutional Amendment and Statute.
57 – Passed – The Economic Recovery Bond Act.
58 – Passed – The California Balanced Budget Act.

November 2, 2004
1A – Passed – Protection of Local Government Revenues.
59 – Passed – Public Records, Open Meetings. Legislative Constitutional Amendment.
60 – Passed – Election Rights of Political Parties. Legislative Constitutional Amendment.
60A – Passed – Surplus Property. Legislative Constitutional Amendment.
61 – Passed – Children's Hospital Projects. Grant Program. Bond Act. Initiative Statute.
62 – Failed – Elections. Primaries. Initiative Constitutional Amendment and Statute.
63 – Passed – Mental Health Services Expansion, Funding. Tax on Personal Incomes Above $1 Million. Initiative Statute.
64 – Passed – Limits on Private Enforcement of Unfair Business Competition Laws. Initiative Statute.
65 – Failed – Local Government Funds, Revenues. State Mandates. Initiative Constitutional Amendment.
66 – Failed – Limitations on "Three Strikes" Law. Sex Crimes. Punishment. Initiative Statute.
67 – Failed – Emergency Medical Services. Funding. Telephone Surcharge. Initiative Constitutional Amendment and Statute.
68 – Failed – Non-Tribal Commercial Gambling Expansion. Tribal Gaming Compact Amendments. Revenues, Tax Exemptions. Initiative Constitutional Amendments and Statute.
69 – Passed – DNA Samples. Collection. Database. Funding. Initiative Statute.
70 – Failed – Tribal Gaming Compacts. Exclusive Gaming Rights. Contributions to State. Initiative Constitutional Amendment and Statute.
71 – Passed – Stem Cell Research. Funding. Bonds. Initiative Constitutional Amendment and Statute.
72 – Failed – Health Care Coverage Requirements. Referendum.

November 8, 2005
73 – Failed – Termination of Minor's Pregnancy. Waiting Period and Parental Notification. Initiative Constitutional Amendment.
74 – Failed – Public School Teachers. Waiting Period for Permanent Status. Dismissal. Initiative Statute.
75 – Failed – Public Employee Union Dues. Required Employee Consent for Political Contributions. Initiative Statute.
76 – Failed – School Funding. State Spending. Initiative Constitutional Amendment.
77 – Failed – Reapportionment. Initiative Constitutional Amendment.
78 – Failed – Prescription Drugs. Discounts. Initiative Statute.
79 – Failed – Prescription Drug Discounts. State-Negotiated Rebates. Initiative Statute.
80 – Failed – Electric Service Providers. Regulation. Initiative Statute.

June 6, 2006
81 – Failed – California Reading and Literacy Improvement and Public Library Construction and Renovation Bond Act of 2006
82 – Failed – Public Preschool Education. Tax Increase on Incomes Over $400,000 for Individuals; $800,000 for Couples.

November 7, 2006
 1A – Passed – Protection of Transportation Funding
 1B – Passed – Highway Safety, Traffic Reduction, Air Quality, and Port Security
 1C – Passed – Housing and Emergency Shelter Trust Fund Act of 2006
 1D – Passed – Kindergarten-University Public Education Facilities Bond Act of 2006
 1E – Passed – Disaster Preparedness and Flood Prevention Act of 2006
 83 – Passed – Comprehensive Registered Sex Offender Laws (popularly known as "Jessica's Law")
 84 – Passed – Bonds for clean water, flood control, state and local park improvements, etc.
 85 – Failed – Parental Notification before Termination of Teen's Pregnancy (second attempt at Proposition 73)
 86 – Failed – Increase on Cigarette Tax
 87 – Failed – Funding for alternative forms of energy
 88 – Failed – Property Parcel Tax to fund for Education
 89 – Failed – Campaign Finance Restrictions, including a corporate tax increase
 90 – Failed – Eminent Domain and Environmental Law Enforcement Restrictions

February 5, 2008
91 – Failed – Transportation money. Initiative Constitutional Amendment.
92 – Failed – Community Colleges. Funding. Governance. Fees. Initiative Constitutional Amendment and Statute.
93 – Failed – Limits on Legislators' Terms in Office. Initiative Constitutional Amendment.
94 – Passed – Referendum on Amendment to Indian Gaming Compact (Pechanga Band of Luiseño Mission Indians)
95 – Passed – Referendum on Amendment to Indian Gaming Compact (Morongo Band of Mission Indians)
96 – Passed – Referendum on Amendment to Indian Gaming Compact (Sycuan Band of the Kumeyaay Nation)
97 – Passed – Referendum on Amendment to Indian Gaming Compact (Agua Caliente Band of Cahuilla Indians)

June 3, 2008 
98 – Failed – Eminent Domain. Limits on Government Authority. Initiative Constitutional Amendment.
99 – Passed – Eminent Domain. Limits on Government Acquisition of Owner-Occupied Residence. Initiative Constitutional Amendment.

November 4, 2008 
1 – State Legislature amended proposition after a number was already designated; amended version became Proposition 1A.
1A – Passed – California High Speed Rail Bond. S.B. 1856.
2 – Passed – Treatment of Farm Animals. Statute.
3 – Passed – Children's Hospital Bond Act. Grant Program. Statute.
4 – Failed – Waiting Period and Parental Notification Before Termination of Minor's Pregnancy. Constitutional Amendment. (third attempt at Proposition 73)
5 – Failed – Nonviolent Offenders. Sentencing, Parole and Rehabilitation. Statute.
6 – Failed – Criminal Penalties and Laws. Public Safety Funding. Statute.
7 – Failed – Renewable Energy. Statute.
8 – Passed – Amends the California Constitution so that "Only marriage between a man and a woman is valid or recognized in California." Initiative Constitutional Amendment.
9 – Passed – Criminal Justice System. Victims' Rights. Parole. Constitutional Amendment and Statute.
10 – Failed – Alternative Fuel Vehicles and Renewable Energy. Statute.
11 – Passed – Redistricting. Constitutional Amendment and Statute.
12 – Passed – Veterans' Bond Act of 2008. S.B. 1572.

May 19, 2009
1A – Failed – State finance.
1B – Failed – Education finance.
1C – Failed – California State Lottery.
1D – Failed – California Children and Families Act: use of funds: services for children.a
1E – Failed – The Mental Health Services Act: Proposition 63 amendments.
1F – Passed – State officer salary increases.

External links
 California Secretary of State Measures Appearing on May 19 Ballot
California Secretary of State – Elections & Voter Information – Initiative Update
Election Volunteer – All Current Propositions

References

2000
Ballot propositions
21st century in law
Ballot propositions, 2000